Radde's accentor (Prunella ocularis) is a species of bird in the family Prunellidae. It is found in mountainous parts of Yemen and northern Southwest Asia.

Its natural habitat is temperate grassland.

Taxonomy
Radde's accentor was described by the German naturalist Gustav Radde in 1884 from a specimen collected in the Talysh Mountains near the Azerbaijan-Iran border. He coined the binomial name Accentor ocularis. It is now placed in the genus Prunella that was introduced by the French ornithologist Louis Vieillot in 1816. The species is monotypic.

References

External links
 Xeno-canto: audio recordings of Radde's accentor

Radde's accentor
Birds of Azerbaijan
Birds of Western Asia
Radde's accentor
Radde's accentor
Taxonomy articles created by Polbot